Mount Hermon School may refer to:

 Mount Hermon School, Darjeeling, India
 Northfield Mount Hermon School, Massachusetts, US